is a mutual life insurance company in Japan, founded in 1907 and headquartered in Osaka.

In 2005, the company announced a joint venture with the People's Insurance Company of China. The new company was named PICC Life Insurance, which sells insurance products, including savings-oriented endowment insurance policies.

In 2012, Sumitomo Life decided to become a strategic partner of Bao Viet Insurance from Vietnam by acquiring 18% of the company's shares previously held by HSBC.

See also
List of investors in Bernard L. Madoff Securities

References

External links
Sumitomo Life Insurance Company (in Japanese)
Sumitomo Life Insurance Company Annual Report (in English)

 
Insurance companies of Japan
Mutual insurance companies
Mitsui
Companies based in Osaka Prefecture
Japanese brands
Sumitomo Group
Financial services companies established in 1907
Japanese companies established in 1907